Marooned - Live is a live album by German thrash metal band Sodom, released in 1994. It was recorded in [Docks, Hamburg, 10 May 1994].

Track listing
 "Intro" – 0:35
 "Outbreak of Evil" – 2:51
 "Jabba the Hutt" – 2:34
 "Agent Orange" – 5:31
 "Jesus Screamer" – 1:48
 "Ausgebombt" – 2:51
 "Tarred and Feathered "  – 3:24
 "Abuse" – 1:33
 "Remember the Fallen" – 4:45
 "An Eye for an Eye" – 4:00
 "Tired and Red" – 5:06
 "Eat Me!" – 2:54
 "Die stumme Ursel" – 3:20
 "Sodomized" – 2:47
 "Gomorrah" – 1:56
 "One Step over the Line" – 4:16
 "Freaks of Nature" – 2:53
 "Aber bitte mit Sahne" – 5:17 (Udo Jürgens cover)
 "Silence Is Consent" – 2:52
 "Wachturm/Erwachet" – 4:24
 "Stalinhagel" – 7:01
 "Fratricide" – 2:53
 "Gone to Glory" – 1:58

Notes
 Tracks 1–21 recorded live at Docks, Hamburg, 10 May 1994.
 "Fratricide" and "Gone to Glory" were recorded during the soundcheck.
 "Stalinhagel" is a combination of the songs "Stalinorgel" and "Bombenhagel".

Credits
 Tom Angelripper - bass, vocals
 Andy Brings - guitars
 Atomic Steif - drums

References

1994 live albums
Sodom (band) live albums
SPV/Steamhammer live albums